Pinner is a London Underground station on the Metropolitan line in zone 5. The station was opened in 1885 as part of the Victorian expansion of dormitory suburbs, and was one of the stations included in the Metro-land project in the early 20th century. The site is served by several bus routes including links to the Hatch End railway station which was known as Pinner & Hatch End prior to 1920. Step free facilities were opened in 2008. Its adjacent stations are Northwood Hills (northbound) and North Harrow (southbound).

Pinner is served by all stations and semi-fast services, one should change at Moor Park for fast service northbound Metropolitan line services. This change is only needed on Mondays-Fridays during peak hours.

History

The station was opened on 25 May 1885, following a prior expansion to nearby Harrow-on-the-Hill station in 1880. It remained the terminus of the Metropolitan Railway until 1 September 1887 when the line was further extended to Rickmansworth. The long, single-story station building on the up (southbound) platform is the original building, and resembles the stations at Rickmansworth, Chorleywood and Chalfont & Latimer. The down platform buildings were built during the four-tracking project of the 1950s and 60s in a matching yellow brick.

In 1915, the Metro-land project was conceived in order to move people out of central London into rural Middlesex. Houses near the stations were built in haste and sold for as little as £400 each. However, in Pinner houses built during this expansion were required to be worth at least £1,000 – compared to Harrow-on-the-Hill where prices were subject to a £750 minimum.

The station building on Station Approach is locally listed by the Harrow Council.

Location
London bus routes 183, H11, H12 and H13 serve the station's location and provide services that terminate at Golders Green, Harrow, Mount Vernon Hospital, Northwood Hills, Ruislip, South Harrow and Stanmore. The H12 route also connects Pinner tube station to Hatch End railway station, which was named Pinner & Hatch End between 1911 and 1920 before being renamed Hatch End (for Pinner) and then, in 1956, Hatch End.

Access to the southbound platform is step-free from the ticket hall. In order to reach the northbound platform, it is necessary to use a footbridge, which was constructed in 2002. Before this, a subway between the two platforms existed, but this was closed for safety reasons. Accessibility lifts opened on 18 July 2008 making the station totally step-free. Originally scheduled for installation in 2005, the delay had been caused by a lack of funding and was originally rescheduled for 2009/10 but following complaints by the Harrow Public Transport Users Association the construction was brought forward to 2007 only to be delayed by the collapse of London Underground contractors Metronet.

Services
In the northbound direction off-peak the station is served by trains to Watford (4tph), Amersham (2tph) and Chesham (2tph) trains (at peak times, 'fast' trains do not stop at stations between Harrow-on-the-Hill and Moor Park). In the southbound direction off-peak services generally run 4tph to Baker Street and 4tph to Aldgate.

References

Gallery

External links

 
 
 
 
 

Metropolitan line stations
Tube stations in the London Borough of Harrow
Former Metropolitan and Great Central Joint Railway stations
Railway stations in Great Britain opened in 1885
Pinner